Ives Roqueta (born 29 February 1936 in Sète, Hérault, died January 4, 2015) was an Occitan author. He played a major role in the country's political and cultural movement. He founded the Ventadorn record company, which can be credited for providing Nòva cançon singers with a proficient media outlet.

Controversy
His cultural and political action is highly controversial.

Some think that he's one of the pioneers of his generation and stands among the nation's most talented poets and novelists.

Other Occitan analysts say that he had a very negative impact over the occitanist movement during the end of the 1970s and the 1980s. Particularly, his anti-scholar positions led to the split of the IEO in 1981.

Bibliography

Poems
 L'Escriveire public (The Letter-Writer), 1958
 Lo Mal de la tèrra (The Land's Evil), 1958
 Roèrgue, si (Yes to Rouergue), 1968
 Òda a Sant Afrodisi (An Ode to Saint Aphrodite), 1968
 Lo Castèl des cans (The Castle of the Dogs), 1977
 Messa pels pòrcs (A Mass for the Pigs), 1970
 Los Negres, siam pas sols (Blacks, Let's Not Be Alone), 1972
 Lo Fuòc es al cementiri (The Cemetery's on Fire), 1974
 Misericòrdia (Mercy), 1986
 L'Escritura publica o pas (Letter-Writing or Not), 1988, a collection of poems written between 1972 and 1987

Prose
 Lo Poèta es una vaca (The Poet Is a Cow), 1967
 La Paciéncia (Patience), 1968
 Made in France (1970)
 Lo Trabalh de las mans (Handmade), 1977
 Lengadòc Roge (Red Languedoc), 1984

Essays
 Los Carbonièrs de La Sala (Decazeville's Miners), 1975
 Las Cronicas de Viure (The Chronicles in Viure magazine), 1963–1974

Discography
 ''Messa Pels Porcs" ("Mass For Pigs"), Institut D'estudis Occitans/Ventadorn I.E.O. S-4 332, 1971

Notes

External links
 English translation of Tota Lenga

1936 births
2015 deaths
People from Sète
Occitan-language writers